Melaleuca preissiana, commonly known as stout paperbark, modong or moonah, is a plant in the myrtle family, Myrtaceae and is endemic to coastal areas of southwest Australia. It is a shrub or small tree with papery bark, small leaves and spikes of usually white flowers. It occurs chiefly in areas that are seasonally wet.

Description

The flowers are usually white, but sometimes a shade of cream or yellow. They are arranged in spikes on the ends of branches which continue to grow after flowering and sometimes in the upper leaf axils. The stamens are arranged in five bundles around the flower and there are 27 to 36 stamens per bundle.

Taxonomy and naming
Melaleuca preissiana was first formally described by Johannes Conrad Schauer in Johann Georg Christian Lehmann's 1844 Plantae Preissianae from a specimen collected by James Drummond. The specific epithet (preissianna) honours Ludwig Preiss, a prolific collector of Western Australian plants and animals.

Distribution and habitat
This melaleuca occurs in coastal regions between Jurien Bay, Western Australia and Albany in the Avon Wheatbelt, Geraldton Sandplains, Jarrah Forest, Mallee, Swan Coastal Plain and Warren biogeographic regions. It is one of three typical trees occurring in the peat of mound springs of the Swan Coastal Plain, ecological communities surrounding aquifer discharges of the Gnangara Mound.

Conservation
Melaleuca preissiana is classified as "not threatened" by the Government of Western Australia Department of Parks and Wildlife.

References

preissiana
Myrtales of Australia
Plants described in 1844
Trees of Australia
Trees of Mediterranean climate
Rosids of Western Australia
Endemic flora of Western Australia
Taxa named by Johannes Conrad Schauer